Tapleys Hill Road is a north–south arterial road which runs parallel to the coast through western Adelaide, Australia. This name covers many consecutive streets and is not widely known to most drivers except for the northernmost section, as the entire allocation is still best known as by the names of its constituent parts: Tapleys Hill Road proper, Brighton Road, Ocean Boulevard, Lonsdale Road, Dyson Road, Murray Road, and Gawler Street. This article will deal with the entire length of the corridor for sake of completion, as well to avoid confusion between declarations.

Route
The Tapleys Hill Road corridor runs north–south through Adelaide's western and south-western suburbs, to the mouth of the Onkaparinga River at its southern end. From its intersection with Port Road in Queenstown, it runs south as Tapleys Hill Road through Seaton and Fulham, passing Adelaide Airport to its west, until it reaches Anzac Highway in Glenelg. It changes name to Brighton Road and continues south through Hove and Brighton.

At Seacliff Park, it changes its name to Ocean Boulevard. At Majors Road in Trott Park, it changes name to Lonsdale Road. It continues in a south-westerly direction through Hallett Cove to meet Sherriffs Road in Lonsdale. It changes name to Dyson Road and continues in a south-westerly direction to Christies Beach. It turns west into Murray Road and turns southwest into Gawler Street to terminate in Port Noarlunga.

Places of interest located on Tapleys Hill Road include the Royal Adelaide Golf Course, Harbour Town and a viewing area at the western end of Adelaide Airport.

Tapleys Hill Road, including all its constituent roads, was designated part of route A15 in 1998. In 2021, this was extended south of the Onkaparinga River, along Saltfleet Street, Commercial Road and Maslin Beach Road to Tatachila.

History
Prior to an upgrade in the 1990s, Tapleys Hill Road's southern end was joined to Anzac Highway, about 100 metres to the west of where it currently lays. The upgrade involved re-aligning the roadway, and taking Tapleys Hill Road to Brighton Road's northern end, removing congestion in a busy area. The old roadway still exists, now named Old Tapleys Hill Road, and is rarely used as a through route, servicing mainly residents of the area.

Tapleys Hill is located west of Flagstaff Road and east of Main South Road on the boundary of the suburbs of O'Halloran Hill and Flagstaff Hill, near the Victoria Hotel (colloquially "Top of Taps Hotel"). The hill was named for Thomas Tapley (1789–1856), who arrived in South Australia aboard the Rajahstan in November 1838 and took up land in that location. 

The hill is the source of the name for Tapleys Hill Road. The road forms the initial half of the traditional route from Port Adelaide to Tapley's Hill. The remainder of the traditional route, from Glenelg onwards, being via Diagonal Road and since-altered local roads up the hill from Darlington.

Major intersections

See also

References

Roads in Adelaide